Stewart Rawlings Mott (December 4, 1937 – June 12, 2008) was an American philanthropist who founded the Stewart R. Mott Foundation. He was the son of Charles Stewart Mott, and appeared on Nixon's Enemies List for his support of liberal causes.

Mott attended the Massachusetts Institute of Technology for three years and finished his education at Columbia University School of General Studies, earning two Bachelor's degrees, one in business administration and one in comparative literature. Mott graduated in 1961 and inherited $6 million with $850,000 in annual income from two trust funds; Mott used his resources to create the first Planned Parenthood clinic in his hometown of Flint, Michigan. He wrote a thesis on Sophocles for a Master's Degree from Columbia, which he never finished. His philanthropy included abortion reform, birth control, sex research, feminism, arms control, gay rights, civil liberties, governmental reform, and research on extrasensory perception. He gave his occupation as "maverick" in the 1978 photo essay Cat People.

Shortly prior to his death Stewart Mott resided in Bermuda for most of his time, and also traveled to his numerous houses in the United States. His houses included a Penthouse on Fifth Avenue in Manhattan, a house trailer on a Florida farm and a Chinese junk moored on the Hudson River in New York City.

References

External links
 New York Times Obituary, June 14, 2008
 The Last Word (NY Times): Stewart R. Mott Video obituary
 CUNY.tv Day ay Night: Stuart Mott March 19, 1974, James Day interviews Stuart Mott (length: 27:58)
 

1937 births
2008 deaths
American philanthropists
Columbia University School of General Studies alumni
Massachusetts Institute of Technology alumni
Nixon's Enemies List
People from Flint, Michigan